The Rhingiini (or Cheilosiini) is a tribe of hoverflies.

List of genera 
Chamaesyrphus Mik, 1895
Cheilosia Meigen, 1822
Endoiasimyia Bigot, 1882
Ferdinandea Rondani, 1844
Hiatomyia Shannon, 1922
Ischyroptera Pokorny, 1887
Katara Vujić & Radenković, 2018
Macropelecocera Stackelberg, 1952
Pelecocera Meigen, 1822
Portevinia Goffe, 1944
Psarochilosia Stackelberg, 1952
Psarus Latreille, 1804
Rhingia Scopoli, 1763
Taeniochilosia Oldenberg, 1916

References 

Brachycera tribes
Eristalinae